Erik Persson may refer to:

 Erik Persson (footballer) (1909–1989), Swedish footballer, bandy player and ice hockey player
 Erik Persson (skier) (born 1995), Swedish skier and Paralympic guide for Zebastian Modin
 Erik Persson (swimmer) (born 1994), Swedish swimmer
 Erik Persson (wrestler) (1914–1969), Swedish wrestler

See also
 Eric Persson (1898–1984), chairman of the Swedish football club Malmö FF